The Chevrolet Blazer EV is an upcoming battery electric mid-size crossover SUV to be manufactured by General Motors under the Chevrolet brand in 2023. The model will offer up  of range. It will be produced in fall of 2023 at GM's plant in Ramos Arizpe, Mexico. 

The Blazer EV will be available in 1LT, 2LT, RS, and SS trim levels. It comes standard with the Chevy Safety Assist safety technologies, and an optional Super Cruise semi-autonomous system. A "Wide Open Watts" (WOW) mode allows the Blazer SS to reach  in less than four seconds. A Police Pursuit Vehicle model will be available in the first quarter of 2024.

References

External links 

 

Blazer EV
Cars introduced in 2022
Mid-size sport utility vehicles
Crossover sport utility vehicles
Front-wheel-drive vehicles
Rear-wheel-drive vehicles
All-wheel-drive vehicles
Production electric cars
Upcoming car models